Sniffing can refer to:
 Inhalation
 Sniffing (behavior)
 Sniffing attack